Zinaida Fyodorovna Korotova (born 5 April 1936) is a retired Russian rower who won eight European titles in the eights event between 1955 and 1962. For this achievement she was awarded the Order of the Badge of Honour.

References

1936 births
Living people
Russian female rowers
Soviet female rowers
European Rowing Championships medalists